Zabzugu-Tatale District is a former district that was located in Northern Region, Ghana. Originally created as an ordinary district assembly in 1988, which was created from the former East Dagomba District Council. However on 28 June 2012, it was split off into two new districts: Zabzugu District (capital: Zabzugu) and Tatale-Sangule District (capital: Tatale). The district assembly was located in the eastern part of Northern Region and had Zabzugu as its capital town.

Demographics
As of the 2010 census, Zabzugu-Tatale District had 123,854 inhabitants. Of those, 57,249 inhabitants were aged up to 14 years old, 61,930 inhabitants were aged between 15 and 64 years old, while 4,675 inhabitants were aged 65 years or older.

References

External links 
 
 GhanaDistricts.com 

Districts of the Northern Region (Ghana)